Bangabandhu Memorial Museum, also known as Bangabandhu Bhaban or Dhanmondi 32, located in Dhanmondi, Dhaka, Bangladesh, was the personal residence of Sheikh Mujibur Rahman, who was also called Bangabandhu, the founder and president of Bangladesh. Rahman was assassinated with most members of his family in this residence. In 2009, RAJUK declared the museum a national heritage site.

History

1956–1961
In 1956, Sheikh Mujibur Rahman, the industry minister of East Pakistan, applied to the government through his private secretary to be allotted a plot in the Dhanmondi residential project in Dhaka, the administrative capital. Until 12 October 1958,  Sheikh Rahman and his family lived in a government building in Shegunbagicha, Dhaka. In 1958, General Ayub Khan suspended the Constitution of Pakistan and imposed martial law. Sheikh Rahman was arrested and his family were evicted from the property, after which they rented a house in Siddheshwari, Dhaka.

As a result of government threats, the family had to vacate the house in Siddheshwari and move to a rented one in Segunbagicha with help from Sufia Kamal.  Sheikh Rahman was imprisoned until 1960; after his release, he constructed a one-storey house there. He began living in the two-room, unfinished house with his family, having secured a loan from House Building Finance Corporation, from 1 August 1961.  Sheikh Rahman had to pay 1,000 advance to get the plot.

1961–1975
Sheikh Rahman's youngest son Sheikh Russel was born in this house on 18 October 1964. In 1966, the house was extended to two storeys and became a complete residential building where many important events in the political history of Pakistan, such as the six point movement, 1969 East Pakistan mass uprising, 1970 Pakistani general election, occurred. It was the centre of political activities of  Sheikh Rahman and the Pakistan Awami League. On the night of 25 to 26 March 1971,  Sheikh Rahman proclaimed the independence of Bangladesh in the house shortly before the Pakistani army arrested him. 

The house was damaged during the 1971 war, after which it was repaired. After  Sheikh Rahman returned from Pakistan, he and his family returned to the house, where they lived from February 1972 to August 1975. On 15 August 1975, disgruntled army officers assassinated  Sheikh Rahman, his wife Sheikh Fazilatunnesa Mujib, and their sons Sheikh Kamal, Sheikh Jamal and Sheikh Russel.

1975–1994
The military government acquired the house after it came to power on 15 August 1975. The Sheikh–Wazed family was forbidden to enter the house so Sheikh Hasina was not allowed inside after she returned to Bangladesh on 17 May 1981. On 10 June that year, Sheikh Hasina obtained ownership of the house when she paid a loan installment; the house was put up for auction due to non-payment of installments of the loan given for construction of the building. On 12 June 1981, the house was officially handed to the surviving family members of  Sheikh Rahman's family; Hasina later found  Sheikh Rahman's diaries in the building and they were later published in the form of memoirs. Sheikh Hasina continued to live in the government quarter in Mohakhali with her husband after obtaining ownership of her father's house, after which she used it for political purposes.

Conversion to a museum

After Sheikh Hasina obtained ownership of the residence, she announced it would be converted into a museum, having had the idea after she was arrested for attending a political program during the 1990 Mass Uprising in Bangladesh. Sufia Kamal, Baby Maudud, Gaziul Haque, Pavel Rahman and many others helped convert the house into a museum. The museum was inaugurated on 14 August 1994, and it was handed to Bangabandhu Memorial Trust to turn it into a museum on 6 September 1994. The trust selected architects Ehsan Khan, Ishtiaque Jahir and Iqbal Habib from an architectural design competition. During the conversion, the trust preserved the original structure of the house. On 20 August 2011, the museum was extended by building a new six-storey structure adjacent to the house.

Memorandum of understanding
The Bangabandhu Memorial Museum signed a memorandum of understanding (MOU) with National Museum, New Delhi, on 17 December 2020 following a virtual summit between India and Bangladesh, aimed at facilitating knowledge-sharing between the two museums on training, the conservation of fabrics and the curation of exhibits.

Description
The ground floor of the house has a drawing room, a reading room and a kitchen. The drawing room was used for political discussions and has housed a gallery since the house became a museum. On the second floor is Sheikh Hasina's bedroom, and those of Sheikh Rahman, Sheikh Jamal, Sheikh Kamal and Sheikh Rehana. Adjacent to Sheikh Rahman's bedroom is a room where he used to watch television and eat meals with his family. The museum houses Sheikh Russel's possessions such as balls, aquariums, toys and watches. There is also a souvenir shop, which has a virtual section that can guide visitors on a virtual tour of the house. This virtual section also has a showcase that contains several important and historical documents. 

The new section of the museum houses the Sheikh Lutfar Rahman and Sheikh Sayera Khatun Gallery', which is after the parents of Bangabandhu. There is also a library and a research centre.  In a room Sheikh Rahman used as a salon where he often meet visitors and guests, a cyclostyle was installed after 7 March 1971 which was used by Sheikh Rahman. There is also a personal library, from which he declared the independence of Bangladesh by wireless. A telephone in this room was damaged by the Pakistani army firing on 25 March 1971. At the entrance to the building is a reception hall on the ground floor that was used for official purposes. While other rooms of the museum are open for visitors, Sheikh Hasina's bedroom, store room and waiting room are closed.

Notable visitors

Mamata Banerjee, Chief Minister of West Bengal, on 21 February 2015.
Narendra Modi, Prime Minister of India, on 6 June 2015.
Ravi Shastri, Director of the Indian Cricket Squad, on 16 June 2015.
John Kerry, 68th United States Secretary of State, on 29 August 2016.
Jim Yong Kim, 12th President of World Bank Group, on 17 October 2016.
Angelina Jolie, American film actress, on 6 February 2019.
Júlio César, Brazilian former professional footballer, on 23 January 2020.
Stephen Biegun, 20th United States Deputy Secretary of State, on 15 October 2020.
Bidya Devi Bhandari, President of Nepal, on 23 March 2021.
Lotay Tshering, Prime Minister of Bhutan, on 23 March 2021.
Manoj Mukund Naravane, 28th Chief of the Indian Army Staff, on 9 April 2021.
Volkan Bozkır, President of Seventy-fifth session of the United Nations General Assembly, on 25 May 2021.
Faisal Naseem, Vice President of Maldives, on 22 November 2021.
Ram Nath Kovind, 14th President of India, on 15 December 2021.
Wang Yi, Foreign Minister of China, on 6 August 2022.
Michelle Bachelet, 7th United Nations High Commissioner for Human Rights, on 15 August 2022.

References

Notes

Citations

External links

Bangabandhu Memorial Museum: Beautiful Bangladesh
Bangabandhu Sheikh Mujib Memorial Museum: Dhaka District 

Sheikh Mujibur Rahman
Dhanmondi
Museums in Dhaka
Art museums and galleries in Bangladesh
History museums in Bangladesh
Houses in Bangladesh
Memorials to Sheikh Mujibur Rahman
Museums established in 1994
Houses completed in 1966
1961 establishments in East Pakistan
Government Museum
Biographical museums in Bangladesh